Karel Koldovský (10 June 1898 – 29 April 1943) was a Czech ski jumper. He competed in the individual event at the 1924 Winter Olympics.

References

External links
 

1898 births
1943 deaths
Czech male ski jumpers
Olympic ski jumpers of Czechoslovakia
Ski jumpers at the 1924 Winter Olympics
People from Vysoké nad Jizerou
Sportspeople from the Liberec Region